Magnus Brostrup Landstad (7 October 1802 – 8 October 1880) was a Norwegian parish priest and provost, hymn writer, and poet who published the first collection of authentic Norwegian traditional ballads in 1853.

Biography
Landstad was born in the village of Måsøy in Finnmark, Norway. He was one of ten children born to the parish priest Hans Landstad (1771–1838) and Margrethe Elisabeth Schnitler (1768–1850). His father was a minister, who first worked in Øksnes in 1806, then relocated to Vinje in 1811 and to Seljord in 1819. His grandfather was Peter Schnitler (1690–1751).  He was a cousin of the priest and local historian Hans Peter Schnitler Krag (1794–1855).

Landstad received a theology degree (cand.theol.) in 1827, and worked after that as the resident chaplain in Gausdal for six years. After that he worked in various parishes in Telemark and Østfold before he became the minister of Sandar in Vestfold in 1859.

He is well known for introducing popular, contemporary Norwegian language into the hymns he wrote, contributing significantly to the spirit of Norwegian romantic nationalism, which grew in Norway during this period.  Although criticized  at the time for the  use of unscientific methods, today it is commonly accepted that he contributed significantly to the preservation of traditional ballads.

His single greatest achievement was the Landstad hymnal (Landstads kirkesalmebog).  He included about 50 of his own hymns in it and completed the editing in 1861. Later revisions were used in Norwegian (bokmål) parishes until 1985. The current official church hymnal contains a number of his hymns as well as his translations of foreign-language hymns.

Personal life
He married Wilhelmine Margrete Marie Lassen (1808–1892) in 1828. They were the parents of twelve children, of whom six died in early childhood. He died in 1880 at Kristiania (now Oslo) and was buried at Vår Frelsers gravlund.

Publications
 1852: Norske Folkeviser. 3 vols. Christiania: C. Tönsberg, [1852–]1853.
 1869: Kirkesalmebok: efter offentlig Foranstaltning. Kristiania: J. W. Cappelens Forlag, 1871

References

Further reading
Amundsen, Arne Bugge. 2012. "The Folk in the Church: Magnus Brostrup Landstad (1812–1880) as a Clerical Folklore Collector." Arv: Nordic Yearbook of Folklore 67-90.

External links 
 Utstilling om Landstad, Karin Helene Hognestad, UBiT.

1802 births
1880 deaths
19th-century Norwegian poets
Norwegian male poets
Norwegian folk-song collectors
19th-century Norwegian composers
19th-century Norwegian male writers
Burials at the Cemetery of Our Saviour
19th-century musicologists